P. K. Raghava Warrier FRCS (13 August 1921 – 26 March 2011) was a cardiothoracic surgeon, author and social activist from Kerala, India.

Biography

P. K. R. Warrier, the youngest son in his family, enrolled for medical studies at Madras Medical College during the early 1940s. As a student, he was actively involved in India's freedom struggle. It was during one of the freedom rallies in his student days that he met his future wife, Devaki Pallam, then an apprentice of Gandhi.
Dr. PKR Warrier's father was Rao Bahadur Dr. Pulakkat Krishna Warrier. His mother was Sreedevi Krishna Varier. He hails from Nellaya, Palakkad district, Kerala. His children are Mr. DK Warrier & Mrs. Anasooya Shaji.

Having completed his undergraduate education at Madras Medical College in June 1946, he worked as a demonstrator of anatomy between July 1947 and December 1948. He remained in Madras training as an unofficial house surgeon and senior house surgeon under Dr. Mohan Rao and Dr. C.P.V. Menon at the General Hospital between January 1949 and June 1950. Between June 1950 and August 1959, he worked as a Civil Assistant Surgeon in various government hospitals throughout South India including Coimbatore, Cochin and Trivandrum as well as a brief stint in Minicoy Island.

Warrier then moved to London to attain his Fellowship of the Royal College of Surgeons. After receiving the Fellowship in January 1960, he went on to receive training in cardiothoracic surgery in Stoke-on-Trent and Queen Elizabeth Hospital, Birmingham until 1962.

On returning to India, he joined as an assistant professor to Professor Raghavachari in the Department of Surgery at Trivandrum Medical College 1964. In 1964, Warrer established the Department of Cardio-Thoracic Surgery at the Medical College. He held the position of professor and head of Cardio-Thoracic Surgery when he retired in 1977. His daughter is married to national film award winner director Shaji N Karun<ref
name="#puzhaBio"></ref>

After formal retirement, he continued to work. He was Professor of Surgery at Kasturba Medical College, Manipal until 1983,  Chief of Surgery at AKG Memorial Hospital, Kannur until 1986, Surgical Consultant at Aswini Hospital, Thrissur and Semalk Hospital, Ottappalam. In 1990, Warrier retired from all professional work, though he continues to be a prominent presence in the field.

Social activism
Warrier maintained a close association with E. M. S. Namboodiripad and other prominent Communist leaders of Kerala. He was sympathetic to the early communist movement of Kerala, and was opposed to government-employed doctors performing in private practise. Warrier remained a renowned figure in these circles.

Books
Warrier has published his autobiography in both Malayalam and English. The Malayalam version first appeared as a weekly series in Deshabhimani Weekly. An expanded and rewritten English version of the book titled Experience and Perceptions was later released in 2004.

Awards received
 Abu Dhabi Sakthi-T. K. Ramakrishnan Award (2007)
 Lifetime Achievement Award instituted by the Heart Care Foundation, a charitable society.
 Dubai Art Lovers' Association Award, for his selfless contribution in the field of medicine and surgery.
 Lifetime achievement award of the Dr. K.P. Nair Foundation.

References

1921 births
2011 deaths
Indian surgeons
Indian medical educators
Medical doctors from Kerala
Madras Medical College alumni
20th-century Indian medical doctors
Indian autobiographers
Malayalam-language writers
Activists from Kerala
20th-century surgeons
Recipients of the Abu Dhabi Sakthi Award